Invitation to Happiness is a 1939 American drama film directed by Wesley Ruggles and written by Claude Binyon. The film stars Irene Dunne, Fred MacMurray, Charlie Ruggles, Billy Cook, William Collier, Sr. and Marion Martin. The film was released on June 16, 1939, by Paramount Pictures.

Plot

Albert 'King' Cole is a talented heavyweight boxer who has potential to achieve the  championship. At least his trainer, Henry 'Pop' Hardy thinks so.  Hardy brings in his friend Mr. Wayne to sponsor Cole.  Cole meets Mr. Wayne's daughter, Eleanor who is arrogant, but Cole manages to catch Eleanor's attention.  Will they overcome their differences and obstacles and be together?

Cast
Irene Dunne as Eleanor Wayne 
Fred MacMurray as Albert 'King' Cole
Charlie Ruggles as Henry 'Pop' Hardy
Billy Cook as Albert Cole Jr.
William Collier, Sr. as Mr. Wayne
Marion Martin as Lola Snow
Oscar O'Shea as Divorce Judge
Burr Caruth as Butler
Eddie Hogan as The Champ

Production credits
 Wesley Ruggles - producer, director
 Claude Binyon - screenplay
 Mark Jerome - story
 Leo Tover - photography
 Farciot Edouart - process photography
 Hans Dreier - art direction
 Ernst Fegté - art direction
 Alma Macrorie - editor
 Edith Head - costumes
 Early Hayman - sound recording
 Richard Olson - sound recording
 A. E. Freudeman - interior decorations
 Frederick Hollander - musical score

References

External links 
 

1939 films
American drama films
1939 drama films
Paramount Pictures films
Films directed by Wesley Ruggles
Films scored by Friedrich Hollaender
American black-and-white films
1930s English-language films
1930s American films